O. montana may refer to:

Odontopodisma montana, insect in family Acrididae
Oxalis montana, Mountain woodsorrel